Maud Football Club are a Scottish football club from the village of Maud, Aberdeenshire. Members of the Scottish Junior Football Association, they currently play in the SJFA North Superleague. The current club formed in 1973 as an Amateur side and joined the SJFA North Region in 1975. Their home ground is Maud Pleasure Park and the club colours are red. The club withdrew from the league at the beginning of the 2002–03 season after some heavy defeats but returned the following year, winning promotion at the first attempt.

The team is managed by Kevin Park.

Kevin Park signed a new contract for three years.

On 20 May 2021, Kevin Park left Maud F.C.

Honours
 North Region Grill League Cup: 2011–12
 North Region Division One winners: 2003–04

External links
 Club website
 Facebook
 Twitter

References

Football in Aberdeenshire
Football clubs in Scotland
Scottish Junior Football Association clubs
Association football clubs established in 1973
1973 establishments in Scotland
Maud, Aberdeenshire